Stichopus noctivagus is a species of sea cucumber in the family Stichopodidae. It is found on the seabed in the tropical, western Indo-Pacific region.

References

Stichopodidae
Animals described in 1980
IUCN Red List least concern species